Charles Émile Troisier (6 April 1844 – 11 December 1919) was a French surgeon.

Life

Charles Émile Troisier was born on 6 April 1844 in Sévigny-Waleppe, Ardennes. 
His mother was Marie-Louise Adeline Marache and his father Antoine Édouard Troisier, a health officer at Sévigny.
He became a doctor of medicine in Paris in 1874, then a professor at the Faculty of Medicine of the University of Paris and a member of the Académie Nationale de Médecine.

He was made a knight of the Legion of Honour on 6 January 1890.

He had a close relationship with Princess Marie Bonaparte.
His son, Jean Troisier (1881–1945), also became a doctor and biologist, and was head of the laboratory at the Pasteur Institute.
His granddaughter, Solange Troisier (1919–2008) was a doctor and a leading feminist.

Works

Legacy
The following are named for him:

 Troisier's sign, a hard, enlarged, left supraclavicular lymph node
 Troisier-Hanot-Chauffard syndrome, a form of diabetes mellitus

References

Sources

1844 births
1919 deaths
French surgeons